Om (or Aum) is a sacred sound, syllable, mantra, and an invocation in Hinduism. Om is the prime symbol of Hinduism. It is variously said to be the essence of the supreme Absolute, consciousness, Ātman, Brahman, or the cosmic world. In Indic traditions, Om serves as a sonic representation of the divine, a standard of Vedic authority and a central aspect of soteriological doctrines and practices. The syllable is often found at the beginning and the end of chapters in the Vedas, the Upanishads, and other Hindu texts.

Om emerged in the Vedic corpus and is said to be an encapsulated form of Samavedic chants or songs. It is a sacred spiritual incantation made before and during the recitation of spiritual texts, during puja and private prayers, in ceremonies of rites of passage (samskara) such as weddings, and during meditative and spiritual activities such as Pranava yoga. It is part of the iconography found in ancient and medieval era manuscripts, temples, monasteries, and spiritual retreats in Hinduism, Buddhism, Jainism, and Sikhism. As a syllable, it is often chanted either independently or before a spiritual recitation and during meditation in Hinduism, Buddhism, and Jainism.

The syllable Om is also referred to as Onkara (Omkara) and Pranava among many other names.

Common names and synonyms 
The syllable Om is referred to by many names, including:
 ; literally, "fore-sound", referring to Om as the primeval sound.
 ; literally, "one Om-maker", and an epithet of God in Sikhism. (see below).
 ; meaning "song, chant", a word found in Samaveda and bhasya (commentaries) based on it, which is also used as a name of the syllable.
 ; literally, "imperishable, immutable", and also "letter of the alphabet" or "syllable".
 ; literally, "one letter of the alphabet", referring to its representation as a single ligature. (see below)

Origin and spiritual significance 
The etymological origins of ōm/aum have long been discussed and disputed, with even the Upanishads having proposed multiple Sanskrit etymologies for aum, including: from "ām" ("yes"), from "ávam" ("that, thus, yes"), and from the Sanskrit roots "āv-" ("to urge") or "āp-" ("to attain"). In 1889, Maurice Blumfield proposed an origin from a Proto-Indo-European introductory particle "*au" with a function similar to the Sanskrit particle "atha". However, contemporary Indologist Asko Parpola proposes a borrowing from Dravidian "*ām" meaning "'it is so', 'let it be so', 'yes'", a contraction of "*ākum", cognate with modern Tamil "ām" meaning "yes".

Regardless of its original meaning, the syllable Om evolves to mean many abstract ideas even in the earliest Upanishads. Max Müller and other scholars state that these philosophical texts recommend Om as a "tool for meditation", explain various meanings that the syllable may be in the mind of one meditating, ranging from "artificial and senseless" to "highest concepts such as the cause of the Universe, essence of life, Brahman, Atman, and Self-knowledge".

The syllable Om is first mentioned in the Upanishads, the mystical texts associated with the Vedanta philosophy. It has variously been associated with concepts of  "cosmic sound" or "mystical syllable" or "affirmation to something divine", or as symbolism for abstract spiritual concepts in the Upanishads. In the Aranyaka and the Brahmana layers of Vedic texts, the syllable is so widespread and linked to knowledge, that it stands for the "whole of Veda". The symbolic foundations of Om are repeatedly discussed in the oldest layers of the early Upanishads. The Aitareya Brahmana of Rig Veda, in section 5.32, for example suggests that the three phonetic components of Om (a + u + m) correspond to the three stages of cosmic creation, and when it is read or said, it celebrates the creative powers of the universe. The Brahmana layer of Vedic texts equate Om with bhur-bhuvah-svah, the latter symbolising "the whole Veda". They offer various shades of meaning to Om, such as it being "the universe beyond the sun", or that which is "mysterious and inexhaustible", or "the infinite language, the infinite knowledge", or "essence of breath, life, everything that exists", or that "with which one is liberated". The Samaveda, the poetical Veda, orthographically maps Om to the audible, the musical truths in its numerous variations (Oum, Aum, Ovā Ovā Ovā Um, etc.) and then attempts to extract musical meters from it.

Pronunciation 
When occurring within spoken Classical Sanskrit, the syllable is subject to the normal rules of sandhi in Sanskrit grammar, with the additional peculiarity that the initial o of "Om" is the guṇa vowel grade of u, not the vṛddhi grade, and is therefore pronounced as a monophthong with a long vowel, ie. ōm not aum. Furthermore, the final m is often assimilated into the preceding vowel as nasalisation. As a result, Om is regularly pronounced  in the context of Sanskrit.

However, this o reflects the older Vedic Sanskrit diphthong au, which at that stage in the language's history had not yet monophthongised to o. This being so, the syllable Om is often archaically considered as consisting of three phonemes: "a-u-m". Accordingly, some denominations maintain the archaic diphthong au viewing it to be more authentic and closer to the language of the Vedas.

In the context of the Vedas, particularly the Vedic Brahmanas, the vowel is often pluta ("three times as long"), indicating a length of three morae, that is, the time it takes to say three light syllables. Additionally, a diphthong becomes  with the prolongation of its first vowel. When e and o undergo  they typically revert to the original diphthongs with the initial a prolonged, realised as an overlong open back unrounded vowel (ā̄um or a3um ). This extended duration is emphasised by denominations who regard it as more authentically Vedic, such as Arya Samaj.

However, Om is also attested in the Upanishads without pluta, and many languages related to or influenced by Classical Sanskrit, such as Hindustani, share its pronunciation of Om ( or ).

Written representations

South Asia 

Nagari or Devanagari representations are found epigraphically on sculpture dating from Medieval India and on ancient coins in regional scripts throughout South Asia. (See above.) The syllable is sometimes written , where  (i.e., the digit "3") explicitly indicates pluta ('three times as long') which is otherwise only implied. For this same reason Om may also be written  in languages such as Hindi, with the  being used to indicate prolonging the vowel sound. In languages such as Urdu and Sindhi Om may be written  in Arabic script, although speakers of these languages may also use Devanagari representations.

In some South Asian writing systems, the Om symbol has been simplified further. In Bengali and Assamese Om is written simply as  without an additional curl. In languages such as Bengali differences in pronunciation compared to Sanskrit have made the addition of a curl for  redundant. Although the spelling is simpler, the pronunciation remains . Similarly, in Odia Om is written as  without an additional diacritic.

There have been proposals that the Om syllable may already have had written representations in Brahmi script, dating to before the Common Era. A proposal by Deb (1921) held that the swastika is a monogrammatic representation of the syllable Om, wherein two Brahmi /o/ characters were superposed crosswise and the 'm' was represented by dot. A commentary in Nature (1922) considers this theory questionable and unproven. A. B. Walawalkar (1951) proposed that Om was represented using the Brahmi symbols for "A", "U", and "M", and that this may have influenced the unusual epigraphical features of the symbol  for Om. Parker (1909) wrote that an "Aum monogram", distinct from the swastika, is found among Tamil-Brahmi inscriptions in Sri Lanka, including Anuradhapura era coins, dated from the 1st to 4th centuries CE, which are embossed with Om along with other symbols.

East and Southeast Asia 
The Om symbol, with epigraphical variations, is also found in many Southeast Asian countries.

In Southeast Asia, the Om symbol is widely conflated with that of the unalome; originally a representation of the Buddha's urna curl and later a symbol of the path to nirvana, it is a popular yantra in Southest Asia, particularly in Cambodia and Thailand. It frequently appears in sak yant religious tattoos, and has been a part of various flags and official emblems such as in the Thong Chom Klao of King Rama IV and the present-day royal arms of Cambodia.

The Khmer adopted the symbol since the 1st century during the Kingdom of Funan, where it is also seen on artefacts from Angkor Borei, once the capital of Funan. The symbol is seen on numerous Khmer statues from Chenla to Khmer Empire periods and still in used until the present day.

In Chinese characters, Om is typically transliterated as either 唵 or 嗡.

Representation in various scripts

Northern Brahmic

Southern Brahmic

East Asian

Other

Hinduism 

In Hinduism, Om is one of the most important spiritual sounds. The syllable is often found at the beginning and the end of chapters in the Vedas, the Upanishads, and other Hindu texts, and is often chanted either independently or before a mantra, as a sacred spiritual incantation made before and during the recitation of spiritual texts, during puja and private prayers, in ceremonies of rites of passages (sanskara) such as weddings, and during meditative and spiritual activities such as yoga.

It is the most sacred syllable symbol and mantra of Brahman, which is the ultimate reality, consciousness or Atman (Self within).

It is called the Shabda Brahman (Brahman as sound) and believed to be the primordial sound (Pranava) of the universe.

Vedas 
Om came to be used as a standard utterance at the beginning of mantras, chants or citations taken from the Vedas. For example, the Gayatri mantra, which consists of a verse from the Rigveda Samhita (RV 3.62.10), is prefixed not just by Om but by Om followed by the formula bhūr bhuvaḥ svaḥ. Such recitations continue to be in use in Hinduism, with many major incantations and ceremonial functions beginning and ending with Om.

Brahmanas

Aitareya Brahmana 
The Aitareya Brahmana (7.18.13) explains Om as "an acknowledgment, melodic confirmation, something that gives momentum and energy to a hymn".

Upanishads

Chandogya Upanishad 
The Chandogya Upanishad is one of the oldest Upanishads of Hinduism. It opens with the recommendation that "let a man meditate on Om". It calls the syllable Om as udgitha (song, chant), and asserts that the significance of the syllable is thus: the essence of all beings is earth, the essence of earth is water, the essence of water are the plants, the essence of plants is man, the essence of man is speech, the essence of speech is the Rigveda, the essence of the Rigveda is the Samaveda, and the essence of Samaveda is the udgitha (song, Om).

The highest song is Om, asserts section 1.1 of Chandogya Upanishad. It is the symbol of awe, of reverence, of threefold knowledge because Adhvaryu invokes it, the Hotr recites it, and Udgatr sings it.

The second volume of the first chapter continues its discussion of syllable Om, explaining its use as a struggle between Devas (gods) and Asuras (demons). Max Muller states that this struggle between gods and demons is considered allegorical by ancient Indian scholars, as good and evil inclinations within man, respectively. The legend in section 1.2 of Chandogya Upanishad states that gods took the Udgitha (song of Om) unto themselves, thinking, "with this song we shall overcome the demons". The syllable Om is thus implied as that which inspires the good inclinations within each person.

Chandogya Upanishad's exposition of syllable Om in its opening chapter combines etymological speculations, symbolism, metric structure and philosophical themes. In the second chapter of the Chandogya Upanishad, the meaning and significance of Om evolves into a philosophical discourse, such as in section 2.10 where Om is linked to the Highest Self, and section 2.23 where the text asserts Om is the essence of three forms of knowledge, Om is Brahman and "Om is all this [observed world]".

Katha Upanishad 
The Katha Upanishad is the legendary story of a little boy, Nachiketa, the son of sage , who meets Yama, the Vedic deity of death. Their conversation evolves to a discussion of the nature of man, knowledge, Atman (Self) and moksha (liberation). In section 1.2, Katha Upanishad characterises knowledge as the pursuit of the good, and ignorance as the pursuit of the pleasant. It teaches that the essence of the Veda is to make man liberated and free, look past what has happened and what has not happened, free from the past and the future, beyond good and evil, and one word for this essence is the word Om.

Maitri Upanishad 

The Maitrayaniya Upanishad in sixth Prapathakas (lesson) discusses the meaning and significance of Om. The text asserts that Om represents Brahman-Atman. The three roots of the syllable, states the Maitri Upanishad, are A + U + M.

The sound is the body of Self, and it repeatedly manifests in three:
 as gender-endowed body – feminine, masculine, neuter;
 as light-endowed body – Agni, Vayu, and Aditya;
 as deity-endowed body – Brahma, Rudra, and Vishnu;
 as mouth-endowed body – garhapatya, dakshinagni, and ahavaniya;
 as knowledge-endowed body – Rig, Saman, and Yajur;
 as time-endowed body – past, present, and future;
 as heat-endowed body – breath, fire, and Sun;
 as growth-endowed body – food, water, and Moon;
 as thought-endowed body – intellect, mind, and psyche.

Brahman exists in two forms – the material form, and the immaterial formless. The material form is changing, unreal. The immaterial formless isn't changing, real. The immortal formless is truth, the truth is the Brahman, the Brahman is the light, the light is the Sun which is the syllable Om as the Self.

The world is Om, its light is Sun, and the Sun is also the light of the syllable Om, asserts the Upanishad. Meditating on Om, is acknowledging and meditating on the Brahman-Atman (Self).

Mundaka Upanishad 

The Mundaka Upanishad in the second Mundakam (part), suggests the means to knowing the Atman and the Brahman are meditation, self-reflection, and introspection and that they can be aided by the symbol Om. 

Adi Shankara, in his review of the Mundaka Upanishad, states Om as a symbolism for Atman (Self).

Mandukya Upanishad 
The Mandukya Upanishad opens by declaring, "Om!, this syllable is this whole world". Thereafter, it presents various explanations and theories on what it means and signifies. This discussion is built on a structure of "four fourths" or "fourfold", derived from A + U + M + "silence" (or without an element).
 Om as all states of Time.
 In verse 1, the Upanishad states that time is threefold: the past, the present and the future, that these three are Om. The four fourth of time is that which transcends time, that too is Om expressed.
 Om as all states of Ātman .
 In verse 2, states the Upanishad, everything is Brahman, but Brahman is Atman (the Self), and that the Atman is fourfold. Johnston summarizes these four states of Self, respectively, as seeking the physical, seeking inner thought, seeking the causes and spiritual consciousness, and the fourth state is realizing oneness with the Self, the Eternal.
 Om as all states of Consciousness.
 In verses 3 to 6, the Mandukya Upanishad enumerates four states of consciousness: wakeful, dream, deep sleep, and the state of ekatma (being one with Self, the oneness of Self). These four are A + U + M + "without an element" respectively.
 Om as all of Knowledge.
 In verses 9 to 12, the Mandukya Upanishad enumerates fourfold etymological roots of the syllable Om. It states that the first element of Om is A, which is from Apti (obtaining, reaching) or from Adimatva (being first). The second element is U, which is from Utkarsa (exaltation) or from Ubhayatva (intermediateness). The third element is M, from Miti (erecting, constructing) or from Mi Minati, or apīti (annihilation). The fourth is without an element, without development, beyond the expanse of universe. In this way, states the Upanishad, the syllable Om is indeed the Atman (the self).

Shvetashvatara Upanishad 
The Shvetashvatara Upanishad, in verses 1.14 to 1.16, suggests meditating with the help of syllable Om, where one's perishable body is like one fuel-stick and the syllable Om is the second fuel-stick, which with discipline and diligent rubbing of the sticks unleashes the concealed fire of thought and awareness within. Such knowledge, asserts the Upanishad, is the goal of Upanishads. The text asserts that Om is a tool of meditation empowering one to know the God within oneself, to realize one's Atman (Self).

Ganapati Upanishad 

The Ganapati Upanishad asserts that Ganesha is same as Brahma, Vishnu, Shiva, all deities, the universe, and Om.

Ramayana 
In Valmiki's Ramayana, Rama is identified with Om, with Brahma saying to Rama:

Bhagavad Gita 

The Bhagavad Gita, in the Epic Mahabharata, mentions the meaning and significance of Om in several verses. According to Jeaneane Fowler, verse 9.17 of the Bhagavad Gita synthesizes the competing dualistic and monist streams of thought in Hinduism, by using "Om which is the symbol for the indescribable, impersonal Brahman".

The significance of the sacred syllable in the Hindu traditions, is similarly highlighted in other verses of the Gita, such as verse 17.24 where the importance of Om during prayers, charity and meditative practices is explained as follows:

Puranas 
The medieval era texts of Hinduism, such as the Puranas adopt and expand the concept of Om in their own ways, and to their own theistic sects.

Vaishnava traditions 
The Vaishnava Garuda Purana equates the recitation of Om with obeisance to Vishnu. According to the Vayu Purana, Om is the representation of the Hindu Trimurti, and represents the union of the three gods, viz. A for Brahma, U for Vishnu and M for Shiva. The Bhagavata Purana (9.14.46-48) identifies the Pranava as the root of all Vedic mantras, and describes the combined letters of a-u-m as an invocation of seminal birth, initiation, and the performance of sacrifice (yajña).

Shaiva traditions 

In Shaiva traditions, the Shiva Purana highlights the relation between deity Shiva and the Pranava or Om. Shiva is declared to be Om, and that Om is Shiva.

Shakta traditions 
In the thealogy of Shakta traditions, Om connotes the female divine energy, Adi Parashakti, represented in the Tridevi: A for the creative energy (the Shakti of Brahma), Mahasaraswati, U for the preservative energy (the Shakti of Vishnu), Mahalakshmi, and M for the destructive energy (the Shakti of Shiva), Mahakali. The 12th book of the Devi-Bhagavata Purana describes the Goddess as the mother of the Vedas, the Adya Shakti (primal energy, primordial power), and the essence of the Gayatri mantra.

Other texts

Yoga Sutra 
The aphoristic verse 1.27 of Pantanjali's Yogasutra links Om to Yoga practice, as follows:

Johnston states this verse highlights the importance of Om in the meditative practice of yoga, where it symbolises the three worlds in the Self; the three times – past, present, and future eternity; the three divine powers – creation, preservation, and transformation in one Being; and three essences in one Spirit – immortality, omniscience, and joy. It is, asserts Johnston, a symbol for the perfected Spiritual Man.

Chaitanya Charitamrita 
In Krishnava traditions, Krishna is revered as Svayam Bhagavan, the Supreme Lord himself, and Om is interpreted in light of this. According to the Chaitanya Charitamrita, Om is the sound representation of the Supreme Lord. A is said to represent Bhagavan Krishna (Vishnu), U represents Srimati Radharani (Mahalakshmi), and M represents jiva, the Self of the devotee.

Jainism 

In Jainism, Om is considered a condensed form of reference to the Pañca-Parameṣṭhi by their initials A+A+A+U+M.

The Dravyasamgraha quotes a Prakrit line:

These five lines are (in English): "(1.) veneration to the Arhats, (2.) veneration to the perfect ones, (3.) veneration to the masters, (4.) veneration to the teachers, (5.) veneration to all the monks in the world".

Buddhism 
Om is often used in some later schools of Buddhism, for example Tibetan Buddhism, which was influenced by Hinduism and Tantra.

Tibetan Buddhism and Vajrayana 

In Tibetan Buddhism, Om is often placed at the beginning of mantras and dharanis. Probably the most well known mantra is "Om mani padme hum", the six syllable mantra of the Bodhisattva of compassion, Avalokiteśvara. This mantra is particularly associated with the four-armed  form of Avalokiteśvara. Moreover, as a seed syllable (Bīja mantra), Om is considered sacred and holy in Esoteric Buddhism.

Some scholars interpret the first word of the mantra  to be , with a meaning similar to Hinduism – the totality of sound, existence, and consciousness.

 has been described by the 14th Dalai Lama as "composed of three pure letters, A, U, and M. These symbolize the impure body, speech, and mind of everyday unenlightened life of a practitioner; they also symbolize the pure exalted body, speech and mind of an enlightened Buddha". According to Simpkins, Om is a part of many mantras in Tibetan Buddhism and is a symbolism for wholeness, perfection, and the infinite.

Japanese Buddhism

A-un 

In Japanese, it is often conflated with the syllable Om. The original Sanskrit term is composed of two letters, the first and the last letters of the Devanagari abugida, with diacritics (including anusvara) on the latter indicating the "-" of "". Together, they symbolically represent the beginning and the end of all things. In Japanese Mikkyō Buddhism, the letters represent the beginning and the end of the universe. This is comparable to Alpha and Omega, the first and last letters of the Greek alphabet, similarly adopted by Christianity to symbolise Christ as the beginning and end of all.

Niō guardian kings and komainu lion-dogs 

The term is also used in Buddhist architecture and Shinto to describe the paired statues common in Japanese religious settings, most notably the Niō and the komainu. One (usually on the right) has an open mouth regarded by Buddhists as symbolically speaking the "A" syllable; the other (usually on the left) has a closed mouth, symbolically speaking the "Un" syllable. The two together are regarded as saying "A-un".

Niō statues in Japan, and their equivalent in East Asia, appear in pairs in front of Buddhist temple gates and stupas, in the form of two fierce looking guardian kings (Vajrapani).

Komainu, also called lion-dogs, found in Japan, Korea and China, also occur in pairs before Buddhist temples and public spaces, and again, one has an open mouth, the other closed.

Sikhism 

Ik Onkar (iconically represented as ) are the first words of the Mul Mantar, which is the opening verse of the Guru Granth Sahib, the Sikh scripture. Combining the numeral one ("Ik") and "Onkar", Ik Onkar literally means "one Om ";  these words are a statement that there is "one God", understood to refer to the "absolute monotheistic unity of God" and implying "singularity in spite of the seeming multiplicity of existence".

According to Pashaura Singh, Onkar is used frequently as invocation in Sikh scripture; it is the foundational word (shabad), the seed of Sikh scripture, and the basis of the "whole creation of time and space".

Ik Onkar is a significant name of God in the Guru Granth Sahib and Gurbani, states Kohli, and occurs as "Aum" in the Upanishads and where it is understood as the abstract representation of three worlds (Trailokya) of creation. According to Wazir Singh, Onkar is a "variation of Om (Aum) of the ancient Indian scriptures (with a change in its orthography), implying the unifying seed-force that evolves as the universe". However, in Sikhism, Onkar is interpreted differently than in other Indian religions; Onkar refers directly to the creator of ultimate reality and consciousness, and not to the creation. Guru Nanak wrote a poem entitled Onkar in which, states Doniger, he "attributed the origin and sense of speech to the Divinity, who is thus the Om-maker".

Thelema 
For both symbolic and numerological reasons, Aleister Crowley adapted aum into a Thelemic magical formula, AUMGN, adding a silent 'g' (as in the word 'gnosis') and a nasal 'n' to the m to form the compound letter 'MGN'; the 'g' makes explicit the silence previously only implied by the terminal 'm' while the 'n' indicates nasal vocalisation connoting the breath of life and together they connote knowledge and generation. Together these letters, MGN, have a numerological value of 93, a number with polysemic significance in Thelema. Om appears in this extended form throughout Crowley's magical and philosophical writings, notably appearing in the Gnostic Mass. Crowley discusses its symbolism briefly in section F of Liber Samekh and in detail in chapter 7 of Magick (Book 4).

Modern reception 
The Brahmic script Om-ligature has become widely recognized in Western counterculture since the 1960s, mostly in its standard Devanagari form, but the Tibetan Om has also gained limited currency in popular culture.

In meditation 

Meditating and chanting of Om can be done by first concentrating on a picture of Om and then effortlessly mentally chanting the mantra. Meditating and mental chanting have been said to improve the physiological state of the person by increasing alertness and sensory sensitivity.

See also
 A in Buddhism
 Beej Mantra
 Religious symbol

Notes

References

Bibliography 

 
 
 
 
 
 
 
 
 

Brahmic graphemes
Hindu philosophical concepts
Buddhist symbols
Hindu symbols
Jain symbols
Sikh symbols
Buddhist mantras
Hindu mantras
Jain mantras
Thelema
Om mantras